Shelley Alexis Duvall (born July 7, 1949) is an American actress and producer who is known for her portrayals of distinct, often eccentric characters. She is the recipient of several accolades, including a Cannes Film Festival Award and a Peabody Award, and nominations for a British Academy Film Award and two Primetime Emmy Awards.

Born in Texas, Duvall began acting after being discovered by director Robert Altman, who was impressed with her upbeat presence, and cast her in the black comedy film Brewster McCloud (1970). Despite her hesitance towards becoming an actress, she continued to work with Altman, appearing in McCabe & Mrs. Miller (1971) and Thieves Like Us (1974). Her breakthrough came with Altman's cult film Nashville (1975), and she earned widespread acclaim with the drama 3 Women (1977), also directed by Altman, for which she won the Cannes Film Festival Award for Best Actress and earned a nomination for the British Academy Film Award for Best Actress in a Leading Role. That same year she appeared in a supporting role (as a writer for Rolling Stone) in Woody Allen's satirical romantic comedy Annie Hall (1977) and hosted Saturday Night Live.

In the 1980s, Duvall became famous for her leading roles, which include Olive Oyl in Altman's live-active feature version of Popeye (1980) and in Stanley Kubrick's horror film The Shining (1980) as protagonist Wendy Torrance. She appeared in Terry Gilliam's fantasy film Time Bandits (1981), the short comedy horror film Frankenweenie (1984) and the comedy Roxanne (1987). She ventured into producing television programming aimed at children and youth in the latter half of the 1980s, notably creating and hosting the programs Faerie Tale Theatre (1982–1987), Tall Tales & Legends (1985–1987) which earned her a Primetime Emmy Award nomination in 1988, and Nightmare Classics (1989).

Duvall sporadically worked in acting throughout the 1990s, notably playing supporting roles in Steven Soderbergh's thriller The Underneath (1995) and the Henry James adaptation The Portrait of a Lady (1996), directed by Jane Campion. Her last performance was in Manna from Heaven (2002), after which she retired from acting. Duvall for many years kept out of the public media, keeping her personal life generally private; however, her health issues earned significant media coverage. After a 20-year hiatus from acting, Duvall is set to return to act in an upcoming horror film titled, The Forest Hills.

Early life
Shelley Alexis Duvall was born on July 7, 1949, in Fort Worth, Texas, the first child of Bobbie Ruth Crawford (née Massengale, 1929–2020), a real estate broker, and Robert Richardson "Bobby" Duvall (1919–1994), a cattle auctioneer-turned-lawyer (not to be confused with actor Robert Duvall, to whom Shelley is not closely related). Duvall has three younger brothers: Scott, Shane, and Stewart.

Duvall spent her first years living in various locations throughout Texas due to her father's work, before the family settled in Houston when she was five years old. Duvall was an artistic and energetic young child, eventually earning the nickname "Manic Mouse" from her mother. She also became interested in science at a young age, and as a teenager aspired to become a scientist. After graduating from Waltrip High School in 1967, Duvall sold cosmetics at Foley's and attended South Texas Junior College, where she majored in nutrition and diet therapy.

Career

1970–1976: Early roles 
Around 1970, she met Robert Altman at a party while he was shooting Brewster McCloud (1970) on location in Texas. Several crew members on the film were fascinated by Duvall's upbeat presence and unique physical appearance, and asked her to be part of the feature. Duvall reflected on committing to the project: "I got tired of arguing, and thought maybe I am an actress. They told me to come. I simply got on a plane and did it. I was swept away." Duvall had never left Texas before Altman offered her a role. She flew to Hollywood and subsequently appeared in the film as the free-spirited love interest to Bud Cort's reclusive Brewster. Altman subsequently chose Duvall for roles as an unsatisfied mail-order bride in McCabe & Mrs. Miller (1971), and the daughter of a convict and mistress to Keith Carradine's character in Thieves Like Us (1974). Duvall appeared as a spaced-out groupie in Altman's ensemble comedy Nashville (1975), which was a critical and commercial success, and a sympathetic Wild West woman in Buffalo Bill and the Indians, or Sitting Bull's History Lesson (1976). The same year, Duvall left Altman to star as Bernice, a wealthy girl from Wisconsin in PBS's adaptation of F. Scott Fitzgerald's short story Bernice Bobs Her Hair (1976). She also hosted an evening of Saturday Night Live and appeared in five sketches: "Programming Change", "Video Vixens", "Night of the Moonies", "Van Arguments" and "Goodnights".

1977–1980: Breakthrough and acclaim 
In 1977, Duvall starred as Mildred "Millie" Lammoreaux in Robert Altman's psychological thriller 3 Women, portraying a woman living in a dreary California desert town. Although there was a written screenplay, Duvall, like other cast members, improvised many of her lines. In spite of the film not being a major box-office success, it received critical acclaim, and Duvall's performance was lauded by critics. Texas Monthly critics Marie Brenner and Jesse Kornbluth praised Duvall for giving an "extraordinary performance". Her performance garnered the award for Best Actress at the 1977 Cannes Film Festival and the LAFCA Award for Best Actress, as well as a BAFTA nomination. She next appeared in a minor role in Woody Allen's Annie Hall (1977).

Duvall's next role was that of Wendy Torrance in The Shining (1980), directed by Stanley Kubrick. Jack Nicholson states in the documentary Stanley Kubrick: A Life in Pictures that Kubrick was great to work with but that he was "a different director" with Duvall. Because of Kubrick's methodical nature, principal photography took a year to complete. The film's script was changed so often that Nicholson stopped reading each draft. Kubrick antagonized his actors, and Kubrick and Duvall argued frequently. Kubrick intentionally isolated Duvall, and went through exhausting shoots, such as the baseball bat scene, which she had performed 127 times. Afterwards, Duvall presented Kubrick with clumps of hair that had fallen out due to the extreme stress of filming. For the last nine months of shooting, she said that the role required her to cry 12 hours a day, five or six days a week, and "it was so difficult being hysterical for that length of time". In an interview with Roger Ebert, she also stated that making the film was "almost unbearable. But from other points of view, really very nice, I suppose."

Even though she received widespread acclaim for her portrayal, Duvall's performance in The Shining was originally nominated for a Golden Raspberry Award for Worst Actress, and Maureen Murphy, co-founder of the Golden Raspberries, stated in 2022 that she regretted giving Duvall a nomination. On March 31, 2022, the Razzie committee officially rescinded Duvall's nomination, stating, "We have since discovered that Duvall's performance was impacted by Stanley Kubrick's treatment of her throughout the production." On Duvall's performance, Vulture wrote in 2019: "looking into Duvall's huge eyes from the front row of a theater, I found myself riveted by a very poignant form of fear. Not the fear of an actor out of her element, or the more mundane fear of a victim being chased around by an ax-wielding maniac. Rather, it was something far more disquieting, and familiar: the fear of a wife who's experienced her husband at his worst, and is terrified that she'll experience it again." Media site Screen Rant described her acting as her "best" career performance, and calling her "the heart of the film; she is out of her depth in dealing with her husband's looming insanity while trying to protect her young son, all while being fearful of the malevolence around her."

While Duvall was in London shooting The Shining, Robert Altman cast her to portray Olive Oyl in his big-screen adaptation of Popeye, opposite Robin Williams. The film was a commercial success, but it received negative reviews. However, Duvall was praised for her performance. The film has been positively re-evaluated in the decades since its release. Film critic Roger Ebert stated that it was a role she was "born to play." "Shelley Duvall is like a precious piece of China with a tinkling personality. She looks and sounds like almost nobody else, and if it is true that she was born to play the character Olive Oyl (and does so in Altman's new musical Popeye), it is also true that she has possibly played more really different kinds of characters than almost any other young actress of the 1970s."

1981–1992: Production ventures 
Duvall's role of Pansy in Terry Gilliam's Time Bandits (1981) followed. Shortly before the release of the film, it was reported that Duvall and actor Stanley Wilson (who portrayed the town barber in Popeye) were set to marry. However, no further reports were released regarding this. In 1982, Duvall narrated, hosted and was executive producer of the children's television program Faerie Tale Theatre. She starred in seven episodes of the series; "Rumpelstiltskin" (1982), "Rapunzel" (1983), "The Nightingale" (1983), "Snow White and the Seven Dwarfs" (1984), "Puss in Boots" (1985), and "Aladdin and His Wonderful Lamp" (1986). Since the program's first episode "The Frog Prince", which starred Robin Williams and Teri Garr, Duvall produced 27 hour-long episodes of the program. In 1985, she created Tall Tales & Legends, another one-hour anthology series for Showtime, which featured adaptations of American folk tales. As with Faerie Tale Theatre, the series starred well-known Hollywood actors with Duvall as host, executive producer, and occasional guest star. The series ran for nine episodes and garnered Duvall an Emmy nomination.

While Duvall was producing Faerie Tale Theatre, it was reported that she was to star as the lead in the film adaptation of Tom Robbins’s Even Cowgirls Get the Blues, which was to star Mick Jagger, Jerry Hall, Cindy Hall and Sissy Spacek. The project was delayed and when finally released in 1993, starred an entirely different cast. She also landed roles in films and television series: the mother of a boy whose dog is struck by car in Tim Burton's short film Frankenweenie (1984), and as Laura Burroughs in Booker (also 1984), a biographical television short based on the life of Booker T. Washington, directed by Stan Lathan. Next, Duvall appeared as a lonely and timid woman who receives a message from a flying saucer in The Twilight Zone episode "The Once and Future King/A Saucer of Loneliness", and the friend of Steve Martin's character in the comedy Roxanne (1987).

Think Entertainment 
In 1988, Duvall founded a new production company called Think Entertainment to develop programs and television movies for cable channels. She created Nightmare Classics (1989), a third Showtime anthology series that featured adaptations of well-known horror stories by authors including Edgar Allan Poe. Unlike the previous two series, Nightmare Classics was aimed at a teenage and adult audience. It was the least successful series that Duvall produced for Showtime and ran for only four episodes. In 1991, Duvall portrayed Jenny Wilcox, the wife of Charlie Wilcox (Christopher Lloyd) in the Hulk Hogan action-adventure film Suburban Commando. In October that year, Duvall released two compact discs, Hello, I'm Shelley Duvall... Sweet Dreams that features Duvall singing lullaby songs and Hello, I'm Shelley Duvall... Merry Christmas, on which Duvall sings Christmas songs. A year later, Duvall landed a guest spot on the television series L.A. Law as Margo Stanton, a show dog owner and breeder who presses charges against the owner of a Welsh Corgi that mated with her prize-winning Afghan Hound. In 1990, she played Little Bo Peep in Mother Goose Rock 'n' Rhyme.

1992–2002: Later work and retirement 
In 1992, Think Entertainment joined the newly formed Universal Family Entertainment to create Duvall's fourth Showtime original series, Shelley Duvall's Bedtime Stories, which featured animated adaptations of children's storybooks with celebrity narrators and garnered her a second Emmy nomination. Duvall produced a fifth series for Showtime, Mrs. Piggle Wiggle, before selling Think Entertainment in 1993 and retiring as a producer. She subsequently appeared as the vain, over-friendly, but harmless Countess Geminisister to the calculating Gilbert Osmond (John Malkovich)in Jane Campion's 1996 adaptation of the Henry James novel The Portrait of a Lady. A year later, she played a beatific nun in the comedy film Changing Habits and a besotted, murderous, ostrich-farm owner in Guy Maddin's fourth feature Twilight of the Ice Nymphs. The same year, she played Chris Cooper's character's gullible wife who yearns for a better life in Horton Foote's made-for-television film, Alone.

Duvall continued to make film and television appearances throughout the late-1990s. In 1998, she played Mrs. Jackson in the comedy Home Fries and Gabby in the direct-to-video children's film Casper Meets Wendy. Near the end of the decade, she returned to the horror genre with a minor role in Tale of the Mummy (1998), co-starring Christopher Lee and Gerard Butler, and The 4th Floor (1999), co-starring Juliette Lewis. In the 2000s, Duvall accepted minor roles, including as the mother of Matthew Lawrence's character in the horror-comedy Boltneck (2000) and as Haylie Duff's aunt in the independent family film Dreams in the Attic, which was sold to the Disney Channel but was never released. Following a small role in the 2002 independent film Manna from Heaven, Duvall took an extended hiatus from acting and public life.

2022–present: Return to acting 
After a 20-year absence, it was announced in October 2022 that Duvall would be returning to acting in The Forest Hills, an independent horror-thriller film directed and written by Scott Goldberg and co-starring Edward Furlong, Chiko Mendez, and Dee Wallace. The film, about a man (Mendez) tormented by nightmarish visions after receiving head trauma in the Catskill Mountains, was given an official trailer the following month.

Personal life 

Duvall married artist Bernard Sampson in 1970. However, their marriage disintegrated as Duvall's acting career accelerated, leading to their divorce in 1974. While she was shooting Annie Hall in New York in 1976, Duvall met singer/songwriter Paul Simon. The couple began a relationship and lived together for two years. Their relationship ended when Duvall introduced Simon to her friend, actress Carrie Fisher; Fisher took up with Simon. Duvall has been in a relationship with musician and former Breakfast Club lead vocalist Dan Gilroy since 1989. The pair began their relationship while co-starring in the Disney Channel show Mother Goose Rock 'n' Rhyme, which was also produced by Duvall.

After the 1994 Northridge earthquake, Duvall relocated from her Benedict Canyon, Los Angeles, home to Blanco, Texas. Duvall stated that when she returned to her home state of Texas in 1994 to shoot the Steven Soderbergh film The Underneath, she made the decision to move back to the state. Eight years later, in 2002, she retired from acting after 32 years in the business.

In November 2016, Duvall agreed to be interviewed by Phil McGraw on his daytime talk show Dr. Phil. After the show aired, USA Today reported that Duvall appeared to be suffering from a mental illness. The segment received significant criticism from the public, with many suggesting that Duvall was being exploited.

Vivian Kubrick, daughter of director Stanley Kubrick, posted an open letter to Dr. Phil on Twitter, while actress Mia Farrow tweeted that it was "upsetting and unethical to exploit Shelley Duvall at this vulnerable time in her life". Director Lee Unkrich also saw the episode and was able to locate her in 2018. The two have become friends, and Unkrich has stated that Duvall remains very proud of her career.

In February 2021, Seth Abramovitch, writer for The Hollywood Reporter, located Duvall for an interview, stating that "I only knew that it didn't feel right for McGraw's insensitive sideshow to be the final word on her legacy." The article noted that her memory was "sharp and full of engrossing stories". With regard to The Shining, Duvall spoke of the emotional toll of performing the role of Wendy Torrance and the challenges of long days on the set, but stated that Kubrick was "very warm and friendly" to her. Anjelica Huston, who was dating Jack Nicholson at the time, believed that Duvall was fully committed to the role and had even rented a small apartment in order to be close to the set.

Filmography

Discography
 Hello, I'm Shelley Duvall...Sweet Dreams (1991)
 Hello, I'm Shelley Duvall...Merry Christmas (1991)

Awards and nominations

References

External links

 
 

1949 births
20th-century American actresses
21st-century American actresses
Actresses from Houston
American film actresses
American television actresses
American voice actresses
American women singers
American women television producers
American women writers
Cannes Film Festival Award for Best Actress winners
S
Living people
Television producers from Texas